The 2010 Vermont gubernatorial general election took place on November 2. Vermont and New Hampshire are the only two states where the governor serves a two-year term instead of four. Primary elections took place on August 24.

Incumbent Republican governor Jim Douglas was not a candidate for re-election. Brian Dubie, the incumbent Lieutenant Governor, was the Republican nominee. The Democratic nomination was won by Peter Shumlin, the President pro tempore of the Vermont Senate.

The result was a 119,543 (49.5 percent) to 115,212 (47.7 percent) plurality for Shumlin. Several minor candidates got between 600 and 2,000 votes each. In accordance with the Vermont Constitution, if no candidate receives a majority, the contest is decided by the Vermont General Assembly. In such races, the combined Vermont House and Senate almost always chooses the candidate who won a plurality. Dubie indicated on November 3 that he did not intend to ask for a recount or contest the election in the legislature, and conceded to Shumlin. On January 6, 2011, with 173 of 180 members voting, 87 votes were necessary for a choice. The General Assembly elected Shumlin on the first ballot, 145-28.

Republican primary

Candidate
 Brian Dubie, Lieutenant Governor

Democratic primary

Candidates
 Susan Bartlett, state senator
 Matt Dunne, Google executive and former state senator
 Deborah Markowitz, Secretary of State of Vermont
 Doug Racine, state senator, former lieutenant governor and nominee for governor in 2002
 Peter Shumlin, Senate President Pro Tempore

Peter Shumlin won the Democratic primary according to the uncertified tabulation of statewide votes released by the Office of the Secretary of State on August 27, 2010, by 197 votes over Doug Racine, who requested a recount. The recount began September 8. Racine conceded on September 10.

Results

Progressive primary

Candidates
 Martha Abbott, state party chair; Abbott won the primary, then withdrew from the election, so the party did not have a candidate on the ballot. The Party had promised not to play a "spoiler" role in the election if Shumlin supported single-payer health care, which he did.

Results

Independent and third-party candidates
 Cris Ericson, United States Marijuana Party
 Dan Feliciano, Independent
 Ben Mitchell, Liberty Union Party
 Em Payton, Independent
 Dennis Steele, Independent

General Election

Predictions

Polling

Results

Vermont's Constitution requires the Vermont General Assembly to select if no candidate obtains a majority. The combined Vermont House and Senate almost always chooses the candidate who won a plurality. The legislature officially elected Peter Shumlin on January 6, 2011.

See also
 List of governors of Vermont
 2010 United States gubernatorial elections

References

External links
Vermont Secretary of State – Elections & Campaign Finance Division
Vermont Governor Candidates at Project Vote Smart
Campaign contributions for 2010 Vermont Governor from Follow the Money
Vermont Governor 2010 from OurCampaigns.com
2010 Vermont Gubernatorial General Election graph of multiple polls from Pollster.com
Election 2010: Vermont Governor from Rasmussen Reports
2010 Vermont Governor Race from Real Clear Politics
2010 Vermont Governor's Race from CQ Politics
Race Profile in The New York Times
Vermont League of Conservation Voters 2010 candidates Q&A from VT LCV
Official campaign websites (Archived)
Brian Dubie for Governor
Trav Fryer for Governor
Cris Ericson for Governor
Emily Peyton For Governor
Peter Shumlin for Governor
Dennis Steele for Governor

2010
Vermont
Gubernatorial